The 1995 Copenhagen Open was a men's tennis tournament played on indoor carpet courts in Copenhagen, Denmark that was part of the World Series of the 1995 ATP Tour. It was the seventh edition of the tournament and was held from 6 March until 12 March 1995. Unseeded Martin Sinner won the singles title.

Finals

Singles

 Martin Sinner defeated  Andrei Olhovskiy, 6–7(3–7), 7–6(10–8), 6–3
 It was Sinners' first singles title of his career.

Doubles

 Mark Keil /  Peter Nyborg defeated  Guillaume Raoux /  Greg Rusedski, 6–7, 6–4, 7–6

References

External links
 ITF tournament edition details

Copenhagen Open
Copenhagen Open
1995 in Danish tennis